Md. Ali Ashraf Fatmi (born 1 January 1956) was a member of the 14th Lok Sabha of India. He represented the Darbhanga constituency of Bihar for 13 years with 4 terms and was a member of the Rashtriya Janata Dal (RJD) political party. Recently he was terminated by Lalu Prasad Yadav's son - Tejashwi Yadav as he showed disrespect to him on no grounds. He joined Bahujan Samajwadi Party (BSP) and declared to fight from Madhubani Constituency, from Bihar but withdrew his candidature next day. He also declared his disassociation with BSP. On 29 July 2019 fatmi joined JDU.

He was Minister of State in the Ministry of Human Resource Development from 2004 till 2009.

He is also a 4-time MP from Darbhanga, Bihar.

Fatmi's son, Faraz Fatmi became an MLA for the first time in the 2015 Bihar Legislative Assembly election. from Koeti, Darbhanga

References

External links
 Home Page on the Parliament of India's Website

1956 births
Living people
People from Bihar
Aligarh Muslim University alumni
Rashtriya Janata Dal politicians
India MPs 2004–2009
Union ministers of state of India
People from Darbhanga district
India MPs 1991–1996
India MPs 1996–1997
India MPs 1998–1999
United Progressive Alliance candidates in the 2014 Indian general election
Janata Dal politicians
Janata Dal (United) politicians